Tmesisternus immitis is a species of beetle in the family Cerambycidae. It was described by Francis Polkinghorne Pascoe 1867.

References

immitis
Beetles described in 1867